The Reindeer River is a river in northern Saskatchewan in the Canadian Shield. It flows south from Reindeer Lake to the Churchill River. The river's flow is regulated by the Whitesand Dam located between Marchand Lake and Fafard Lake.

Access is by Highway 102 that ends at the community of Southend.

See also 
List of reservoirs by surface area
List of rivers of Saskatchewan
Hudson Bay drainage basin

References

External links 
Southend, Reindeer Lake - Reindeer River - Churchill River – Sandy Bay

Rivers of Saskatchewan
Tributaries of Hudson Bay